Anthony Pittman (born November 24, 1996) is an American football linebacker for the Detroit Lions of the National Football League (NFL). He played college football at Wayne State.

College career 
Pittman prepped at Birmingham Groves High School where he was all league and district as a senior. Lightly recruited he played college football at Wayne State. At Wayne State, Pittman was a two-year team captain and two-year all-Great Lakes Intercollegiate Athletic Conference performer. During his college career, Pittman recorded 181 career tackles. Pittman also saw action on special teams for the Warriors.

Professional career 

Pittman went undrafted in the 2019 NFL Draft. He then signed with the Detroit Lions.

On December 4, 2019, Pittman was released from the Lions practice squad. He was resigned to the practice squad on December 9, 2019. Pittman was promoted to the active roster on December 27, 2019.

On September 5, 2020, Pittman was waived by the Lions and signed to the practice squad the next day. He was placed on the practice squad/COVID-19 list by the team on December 22, 2020, and restored to the practice squad on January 2, 2021. He signed a reserve/future contract on January 5, 2021.

On August 30, 2022, Pittman was waived by the Lions and signed to the practice squad the next day. He was promoted to the active roster on September 27.

References

External links 
Wayne State bio

1996 births
Living people
American football linebackers
Wayne State Warriors football players
Detroit Lions players
People from Birmingham, Michigan
Players of American football from Michigan